Namadhari Naik or Halepaika is a Hindu Kshatriya community (the same Community also known as Halepaika, Namadhari Naik, Namadhari Gowda) predominantly found in Uttara Kannada, Udupi district and Dakshina Kannada District soldier community of Karnataka State in India and are numerically a majority community in the Uttara Kannada district. They have sub castes - Dasa Pantha and Bhakti Pantha. They are the followers of Sri Madvacharya and Sri Raamanujachaarya. They originated from the South coastal region of Karnataka. They are an agricultural and priest community, though agriculture once formed an important source of income. The people of the community use Nayak (ನಾಯಕ)and Naik (ನಾಯ್ಕ), Gowda as surnames. The community considers the Lord of Tirupati Venkataramana as their deity, apart from the local gods and Local group of family deities depending on their place of origin.

Origin
According to the People of India series by the Anthropological Survey of India it, the Halepaiks/Komarpaiks are migrants from Andhra Pradesh. It refers to the legend of king Gopala Krishnaraya who was ruling Vijayanagar, when the Halepaiks were living in Kumarakshetra near the capital (read: Hampi). It says that one of the Halepaiks, Narayana, son of Ranga Naik and Laxmi Devi, impressed the king by faithfully serving him, pleased with which the King granted him the village of 'Halepaik' as inam.
 
Halepaiks find continuous reference in Kuvempu's Malegalalli madumagalu and Kanuru Heggaditi which deal with life in the Western Ghats in the 19th century. The then contemporary condition of Halepaiks, vague reference to their origins, social standings, inter relation with other communities, ongoing class struggle can be summed up from this work. Kuvempu indicates that there was a decision taken among the landlords that Halepaiks were to be not allowed to hold their own lands and were to be confined to tilling others' lands. The discrimination extended to ceremonies and rituals as well with the Halepaik groom not allowed to ride a horse to his marriage as was the practice for ages. The landlords seem to have guarded this privilege of theirs very closely. This also indicates the social downfall Halepaiks had attained by then.

Present conditions and social status
This caste is also found in the adjoining districts of North and South Canara. It is possible that they be akin to the Thiyyas of Malabar, whose status, and occupation bear a close resemblance to their own. The term ' Hale Paikas ' probably implies that they were the old infantry or the foot - soldiers. Hale paika namadhari means Halu Kshatriyas ( milk Kshatriyas). They affix the title Näik to their names , though they generally go without any appellation . In a few places , the title ' Gauda ' is added to the names of this people. The Hale Paikäs of Mysore speak both Canarese and Tulu. So also had the Thiyyars of North Malabar formed a military class in former times , and there was a Thiyyar Regiment of a thousand soldiers at Thalassery with men of their own caste, who held high and responsible posts and distinguished themselves by the most conspicuous gallantry and fidelity in East india Company.
 bridegroom and their friends on their marriage occasions, namely, a pointed helmet on their heads, the kacha, i.e., cloth worn round the loin, a knife stuck in the girdle and drawn swords and shields in the hands of the bride groom and his two friends. The sword and shield dance were the indispensable accompaniments until lately, all denoting a warlike career. There is a legend that one of their ancestors be came Commanders of the Vijayanagar army, and was made ruler of a State and given a village named Hale Paika as a jagir ( hereditary assignment of land). 

The martial Halepaiks took to agriculture in peacetime and down the centuries were left with small landholdings, a condition which led to them being downtrodden and marginalized. Until recently Halepaiks were known for their status as resident cultivators (Gross-crop sharing), that is working on lands passed on by heredity on the condition of parting with a portion of produce. This system is known as geni paddati (tenure system) in Kannada. There are two versions, Moola geni (protected tenant with certain rights; similar to Bhoomidar of Uttar Pradesh) being the hereditary one and Chala geni (tenant at will; ex Sirdars and Asamis of U.P) given on a contract lasting 4–5 years. Halepaiks became almost synonymous with the Moolageni system. With the undergoing changes at the socio-political level and the onset of lenders the condition became such that over the last century every family which was poor to own land by themselves took to the above said system irrespective of caste, creed and community. From Brahmins to Muslims they were at it for livelihood. Most became resident cultivators in their own land due to debt trap. Even so, there was oppression in the Geni system with the landlords resorting to arm twisting and violence to extract greater share. This led to one of the most important agrarian movements in post independent India, the Kagodu satyagraha. The Kagodu Satyagraha of 1951 turned out to be a memorable period for the community, with many from community assuming leadership in the movement. The doyen of community like H.Ganpatiyappa, Savaji Beera Naik, Mandagadale Ram Naik worked closely with leaders like Shantaveri Gopalagowda, Yusuf Meherally to make it a success. This movement was very much responsible for the future land reforms that took place giving the land to the tiller.

Today, the community has taken to modern education and is upwardly mobile.

Notable people
 Shivanand Naik, former minister, Government of Karnataka
 S.V.Nayak, former MLA
 R N Naik, Former Minister Karnataka state government, MLA Bhatkal
J D Naik, former M L A, Bhatkal
K G Naik, Hanajibail, former BJP District President, former Siddapura Town Panchayat president.
Bhimanna Naik, D C C President
Devaray Naik, former Lok Sabha member
Sunil Naik, M L A, Bhatkal
R S Naik, former Rajya Sabha member
Ravi Nayak, Actor 
Krishna Naik, Artist
Lokesh Naik Gunavanthe, Yakshagana Artist

References

Ethnic groups in India
Karnataka society
Social groups of Karnataka
Brewing and distilling castes